Nuala Creed (born in 1954 in Dublin, Ireland) is a ceramic sculptor living in Northern California, United States. She is known for a series of over 120 Ceramic Archivists, on display as a permanent collection at the Internet Archive in San Francisco. She is also known for her political work.

Biography 
Born in Dublin, Ireland, Creed lived in London as a young adult, and then moved to Boston in 1979 where she took courses at Massachusetts College of Art and Design. In 1996 she moved to San Francisco with her husband, Jeffrey Ventrella, where she earned her BFA at California College of the Arts, graduating with high distinction.

Creed has worked primarily with the human figure, incorporating themes of childhood, vulnerability, and social issues.

Political work 
After being invited to make an ornament (a ceramic hummingbird) for the White House Christmas tree in 2002, Creed began making variations of this work in protest of the 2003 Invasion of Iraq. This led to a series called "Babes in Arms".

Creed's political work has been published in several art books  and shown in galleries in Europe and the United States.

Ceramic Archivists 
Inspired by the Terra Cotta Warriors in China, Internet Archive founder Brewster Kahle invited Creed to begin making figures of employees who have worked at the Archive for three or more years. This series began in 2010, and is currently ongoing.

Prominent figures such as Ted Nelson, Brewster Kahle and Aaron Swartz are included in this collection. Thirty-two of these figures were exhibited at "From Clay to Cloud", at Loyola Marymount University's Laband Art Gallery in Los Angeles in 2016.

References

External links
 Nuala Creed's home page
 A page about the Ceramic Archivists
 Clay Sculptures of Archivists Show the Human Face of Big Data
 Into the Labyrinth
 Steve Jobs, Wikipédia, Snowden : des statues en hommage à Internet

Further reading
 500 Figures in Clay, vol 2. Lark Books, 2014 (page 414).
 Ceramics Today, Schiffer LTD, 2010 (pages 48 and 49).
 500 Handmade Dolls, Lark Books, 2007 (pages 138 and 167, and 171).

1954 births
Living people
Artists from Dublin (city)
Irish ceramicists
Irish women ceramicists
20th-century Irish artists
21st-century Irish artists
20th-century Irish women artists
21st-century Irish women artists
21st-century ceramists